Bachelder is a surname. Notable people with the surname include:

 Chris Bachelder (born 1971), American writer
 John B. Bachelder (1825–1894), American portrait and landscape painter, lithographer, and photographer
 Joseph Bachelder III (1932–2020), American executive compensation lawyer
 Myrtle Bachelder (1907–1997), American chemist and educator
 Nahum J. Bachelder (1854–1934), American politician
 Stephen Bachiler (c. 1561–1656), early proponent of "Separation of church and state" and progenitor of many Bachelder and Batchelder families

See also
 Batchelder
 Bachelor, a man above the age of majority who has never been married